These are the official results of the Men's 20 km Walk event at the 1995 World Championships held on Sunday 6 August 1995 in Gothenburg, Sweden. There were a total number of 46 participating athletes and two non-starters.

Medalists

Abbreviations
All times shown are in hours:minutes:seconds

Records

Intermediates

Final ranking

See also
 1992 Men's Olympic 20km Walk (Barcelona)
 1993 Men's World Championships 20km Walk (Stuttgart)
 1994 Men's European Championships 20km Walk (Helsinki)
 1995 Race Walking Year Ranking
 1996 Men's Olympic 20km Walk (Atlanta)
 1997 Men's World Championships 20km Walk (Athens)
 1998 Men's European Championships 20km Walk (Budapest)

References
 Results
 Die Leichtathletik-Statistik-Seite

W
Racewalking at the World Athletics Championships